The International Floorball Federation (IFF) is the worldwide governing body for the sport of floorball.  It was founded on 12 April 1986 in Huskvarna, Sweden, by representatives from the national floorball associations of Finland, Sweden and Switzerland.  It is recognized by the IOC and is an ordinary member of the ARISF.

Events

 Men's World Floorball Championship
 Women's World Floorball Championship
 Under-19 World Floorball Championships
 Floorball European Championships
 Asia-Oceania Floorball Cup
 Asia Pacific Floorball Championships
 Southeast Asian Floorball Championships

Members
 This is a list of International Floorball Federation member nations. It includes associations, committees, confederations, federations, and unions.

There are currently 77 IFF members (45 ordinary members and 32 provisional members in April 2022). The newest members are Macau and Kazakhstan.

Members by Regions

Ordinary members

 IFF founded
1 The Hungarian Floorball Federation was originally established in 1989, but reorganized into a new organization in 1997.
2 The Icelandic Floorball Committee is a division of the Icelandic National Olympic Committee, and therefore governed by it.
3 The Floorball Association of Iran is a division of the Iran Federation of Sport Associations, and therefore governed by it.
4 The Liechtenstein Floorball Association was established as a single floorball club, UHC Schaan.
5 The Norwegian Floorball Federation is a division of the Norway's Bandy Association, and therefore governed by it.
6 The Great Britain Floorball & Unihockey Association was the originating governing body representing floorball within Great Britain, before being replaced by the United Kingdom Floorball Federation in 2012.
7 In 1 March 2022, as a reaction in response to the 2022 Russian invasion of Ukraine, both National Floorball Federation of Russia (NFFR) and Floorball Federation of Belarus are suspended from international Floorball activities. In addition, no floorball events may organise in both countries, and no representatives, include athletes and players, may participant all kind of IFF Competitions, events or meetings until future notice.

Provisional members

Development countries
Not yet IFF member:
Bangladesh
Bosnia and Herzegovina
Bulgaria
Greece
Jordan
Luxembourg
Mali
Nepal
Qatar
Sri Lanka
United Arab Emirates

Other

Confederations

Registered Players
Based on the number of registered floorball players and a country's population, a list of the top 25 countries has been compiled:

Notes and references

See also
 IFF World Ranking
 Association of IOC Recognised International Sports Federations

External links
Official website

 
Floorball governing bodies
Floorball in Finland
International sports organizations
Organisations based in Helsinki
Sport in Helsinki
Sports governing bodies in Finland
Sports organizations established in 1986